Presidente Sarney is a municipality in the state of Maranhão in the Northeast region of Brazil.

The municipality contains a small part of the Baixada Maranhense Environmental Protection Area, a  sustainable use conservation unit created in 1991 that has been a Ramsar Site since 2000.

See also
List of municipalities in Maranhão

References

Municipalities in Maranhão